I Came to Hear the Music is the 1974 album by singer-songwriter Mickey Newbury, his fourth release on Elektra Records. The cover photography was by Norman Seeff.

I Came to Hear the Music was collected for CD issue on the eight-disc Mickey Newbury Collection from Mountain Retreat, Newbury's own label in the mid-1990s, along with nine other Newbury albums from 1969 to 1981.

Track listing 
All tracks composed by Mickey Newbury
 "I Came To Hear The Music" - 4:15
 "Breeze Lullaby" - 1:51
 "You Only Live Once (In a While)" - 3:28
 "Yesterday's Gone" - 3:30
 "If You See Her" - 4:14
 "Dizzy Lizzy" - 3:54
 "If I Could Be" - 2:52
 "Organized Noise" - 2:22
 "Love, Look At Us Now" - 2:58
 "Baby's Not Home" - 3:47
 "1 X 1 Ain't 2" - 5:01

Charts

Cover versions 
 "Love Look At Us Now" was recorded by Edward Woodward, Johnny Rodriguez and Joe Simon.
 "1x1 Ain't 2" was covered by psychedelic garage band Neal Ford and the Fanatics.
 "If You See Her" appeared on albums by Waylon Jennings and Johnny Rodriguez.
 Don Gibson performed "Baby's Not Home."
 Glenn Barber scored a minor country hit with "You Only Live Once (In a While)."
 Will Oldham cut a version of "I Came to Hear the Music."

References

External links 
 Mickey Newbury Website

Mickey Newbury albums
1974 albums
Elektra Records albums